Tubular bells (also known as chimes) are musical instruments in the percussion family. Their sound resembles that of church bells, carillon, or a bell tower; the original tubular bells were made to duplicate the sound of church bells within an ensemble. Each bell is a metal tube,  in diameter, tuned by altering its length. Its standard range is C4–F5, though many professional instruments reach G5. Tubular bells are often replaced by studio chimes, which are a smaller and usually less expensive instrument. Studio chimes are similar in appearance to tubular bells, but each bell has a smaller diameter than the corresponding bell on tubular bells.

Tubular bells are sometimes struck on the top edge of the tube with a rawhide- or plastic-headed hammer. Often, a sustain pedal will be attached to allow extended ringing of the bells. They can also be bowed at the bottom of the tube to produce a very loud, very high-pitched overtone.

The tubes used provide a purer tone than solid cylindrical chimes, such as those on a mark tree.

Chimes are often found in orchestral and concert band repertoire. It rarely plays melody, instead being used most often as a color to add to the ensemble sound. It does have solos occasionally, often depicting church bells.

In tubular bells, modes 4, 5, and 6 appear to determine the strike tone and have frequencies in the ratios 92:112:132, or 81:121:169, "which are close enough to the ratios 2:3:4 for the ear to consider them nearly harmonic and to use them as a basis for establishing a virtual pitch". The perceived "strike pitch" is thus an octave below the fourth mode (i.e., the missing "1" in the above series).

Classical music
Tubular bells first appeared between 1860 and 1870 in Paris.
The Englishman John Harrington patented tubular bells made of bronze. Arthur Sullivan may have been the first composer to score for tubular bells in the orchestra, in 1886. 
In the early 20th century tubular bells were also incorporated into theater organs to produce effects.

Tubular bells as a substitute for church bells were first used by Giuseppe Verdi in his operas Il trovatore (1853) and Un ballo in maschera (1859) and by Giacomo Puccini in Tosca (1900).

Passages in classical music:

Giuseppe Verdi – Rigoletto (1851)
Giuseppe Verdi – Il trovatore (1853)
Giuseppe Verdi – Un ballo in maschera (1859)
Modest Mussorgsky – Boris Godunov (1869, 1872, 1874)
Pyotr Ilyich Tchaikovsky – 1812 Overture (1880)
Pietro Mascagni – Cavalleria rusticana (1890)
Ruggero Leoncavallo – The Bajazzo (1892)
Gustav Mahler – Symphony No. 2 (1895)
Giacomo Puccini – Tosca (1900)
Alexander Scriabin – Le Poème de l'extase (1908)
Anton Webern – Six Pieces for large orchestra (1909–10, revised 1928)
Claude Debussy – Ibéria (1910)
Gustav Holst – The Planets (1914–16)
Giacomo Puccini – Turandot (1926)
Edgard Varèse – Ionisation (1931)
Richard Strauss – Die schweigsame Frau (1935)
Paul Hindemith – Symphonic Metamorphosis of Themes by Carl Maria von Weber (1944)
Benjamin Britten – Albert Herring (1945)
Aaron Copland – Symphony No. 3 (1946)
Olivier Messiaen – Turangalîla-symphonie (1946–48)
Carl Orff – Antigonae (1949)
Dmitri Shostakovich – Symphony No. 11 (1957)
Olivier Messiaen – Chronochromie (1959–60)
Arvo Pärt - Cantus in Memoriam Benjamin Britten (1977)
David Stanhope - Folksongs for Band, Suite no. 3 (1991, revised 2016)
Daron Hagen– Shining Brow (1993)

In popular music
Multi-instrumentalist Mike Oldfield named his first album Tubular Bells, best known for providing the musical theme to The Exorcist film (1973). At the beginning of his solo symphony recording project in 1972, Oldfield discovered a set of tubular bells at The Manor Studio in Oxfordshire, England, and asked new owner Richard Branson for permission to use them. The chimes were played by Oldfield on parts of the album, and they supplied the album name. Branson's company Virgin Records benefitted tremendously as Oldfield's album sold millions of copies; this also contributed to Branson's personal wealth and industry leverage.

Other uses
Tubular bells can be used as church bells, such as at St. Alban's Anglican Church in Copenhagen, Denmark. These were donated by Charles, Prince of Wales.

Tubular bells are also used in longcase clocks, particularly because they produce a louder sound than gongs and regular chime-rods and therefore could be heard more easily.

See also
 Bell plate
 Tubaphone
 Wind chime

References

External links 
 Information about tubular bells – Vienna Symphonic Library

Bells (percussion)
Keyboard percussion instruments
Pitched percussion instruments
Metal percussion instruments
Orchestral percussion instruments
Tube percussion idiophones